The San Marino national football team represents the nation of San Marino in the international association football. It is fielded by the San Marino Football Federation, the governing body of football in San Marino, and competes as a member of the Union of European Football Associations (UEFA), which encompasses the countries of Europe. The San Marino Football Federation became affiliated with the Fédération Internationale de Football Association (English: International Federation of Association Football) (FIFA) in 1988 and the country's first international match took place two years later on 14 November 1990 against Switzerland in a UEFA Euro 1992 qualifier. San Marino's first result that was not a defeat was a 0–0 draw at home to Turkey in a 1994 FIFA World Cup qualifier on 10 March 1993, and the team's first and only win came over 10 years later after Liechtenstein were beaten 1–0 in a friendly on 28 April 2004.

Since 1990, 97 players have appeared for the San Marino national team, all of whom are listed here. Defender Damiano Vannucci holds the record for most caps, having appeared 64 times for San Marino from 1996 to 2011. The side's all-time top scorer is Andy Selva, who with eight goals from 57 caps is the only player to have scored more than one goal for San Marino. The team's most-capped goalkeeper, Federico Gasperoni, represented San Marino 41 times between 1996 and 2005. While San Marino have yet to qualify for the finals of a major international tournament, Davide Gualtieri holds the record for the fastest goal in a FIFA World Cup qualifier, scoring eight seconds into a 1994 World Cup qualifier against England on 17 February 1993.

Players
Appearances and goals are composed of FIFA World Cup and UEFA European Football Championship qualification matches, as well as numerous international friendly matches. The years given in the column marked "national team career" are those of each player's first and last international cap. Players are listed by number of caps, then number of goals scored. If number of goals are equal, the players are then listed alphabetically. Statistics are correct as of the match played on 11 October 2011.

Footnotes

References

 
Association football player non-biographical articles